The 2022 Overwatch League playoffs was  the postseason tournament of the 2022 Overwatch League regular season. The tournament began on October 30 and concluded with the 2022 Grand Finals, the fifth championship match of the Overwatch League (OWL), on November 4. Twelve teams contested the OWL playoffs, a double-elimination tournament, with the final two teams remaining in the tournament advancing to the Grand Finals. All playoff matches will take place at the Anaheim Convention Center in Anaheim, California.

The defending OWL champions were the Shanghai Dragons, who won the title against the Atlanta Reign in the 2021 OWL Grand Finals. The Dallas Fuel defeated the San Francisco Shock in the Grand Finals by a score of 4–3 to win their first OWL championship.

Format 
Twelve teams qualified for the season playoffs. In the league's West region, eight teams qualified: the top six teams based on the Western regular season standings and the top two teams from the Western play-in tournament. In the league's East region, four teams qualified: the top three teams based on the Eastern regular season standings and the top team from the Eastern play-in tournament. All teams were seeded into the playoffs based on their overall league points earned throughout the regular season. Any ties in league points were broken by the league's tiebreaking rules.

The playoffs were a double-elimination tournament. The top four seeds received a bye to the second round of the upper bracket, and of those, the top three selected their opponent for those matches. The remaining teams started in the first round of the upper bracket. In each match, the higher-seeded team had the choice of which map to play first from a pool of maps. Each following map was chosen by the losing team from the previous map. The winner of each was determined by which team won three maps first, aside from the Grand Finals, which was first-to-four.

Venue 

All matches were played at the Anaheim Convention Center in Anaheim, California. It was the first time that the OWL has held live playoff matches since the 2019 Grand Finals in Philadelphia.

Participants

Bracket

Matches

Winnings 
Teams in the season playoffs competed for a total prize pool of million, with the payout division detailed below.

References 

Overwatch
Playoffs